Lake Vadkert (sometimes also called Büdös-tó, "Stinky Lake") is a lake near the town of Soltvadkert, Hungary. It became one of the most popular tourist destinations in Hungary since it had similar features to Lake Balaton, but cheaper prices and no overcrowding.

History
Lake Vadkürt was first mentioned on military maps in the 1780s. Although it dried out during the centuries, today it is nationally known for its clean water and great beaches. It contains 70 ha of water. 

One side of the lake is used for fishing, the other is for swimming. There are bungalows all around the lake and a dozen restaurants. There are a couple of camping places mostly used by young people.

Summer programs
May: the annual meeting of the Hungarian Motorcycle club, rock concerts, and festivals
First Sunday of July: wine festival, theater, and open-air programs
Last weekend of July: Beer festival, open-air programs, and rock concerts
August 20.: St. Stephen's day in Hungary, festivals, fireworks

Vadkert
Geography of Bács-Kiskun County
Tourist attractions in Bács-Kiskun County